Timothy Mayotte (born August 3, 1960) is a former professional tennis player from the United States.

Professional career
A tall serve-and-volleyer, Mayotte learned to play the game on the public courts of Forest Park in his hometown of Springfield, Massachusetts. He played tennis for Stanford University in the early-1980s and won the NCAA singles title in 1981.

Mayotte won his first top-level professional singles title in 1985 at the inaugural Lipton International Players Championships (now known as the Miami Masters). Other career highlights included winning the Queen's Club Championships in London in 1986, capturing the Paris Indoor title in 1987, and winning the men's singles silver medal at the 1988 Olympic Games in Seoul.

His best performances in Grand Slam tournaments  came in reaching the semifinals at Wimbledon in 1982 and the Australian Open in 1983. He also reached the quarterfinals of the US Open in 1989.

During his career, Mayotte won 12 singles titles and one doubles title. His career-high singles ranking was world No. 7. His final singles title was won in 1989 at Washington DC. Mayotte retired from the professional tour in 1992.

He was hired by the United States Tennis Association (USTA) to serve as a national coach in July 2009.

Mayotte's older brother Chris also played on the international tennis tour for a few seasons.  Their older brother John was the number one junior player in New England and later one of the top players in the New England Tennis Stars (NETS), a tour started by Ted Hoehn in the late 1970s and 1980s.

He then went to work as a tennis agent working for Donald Dell's ProServ. There, he managed top-ten and All-American players on the ATP  and WTA Tours. His clients included Amanda Coetzer and Greg Rusedski, who became semifinalist and finalists at the French Open and US Open consecutively.

Coach with USTA Player Development Program
After working as a coach for USTA Player Development under General Manager Patrick McEnroe, Mayotte spoke publicly about his experiences:

"One big issue and an expression of the pervading arrogance is that the bosses there at the USTA PD have no willingness or ability  to deeply discuss ideas and methods.  They want to produce great, strong independent players who can be flexible and adjust and yet they (the bosses) do not display any of these qualities. We have cultural dissonance of the highest and most destructive order going on there. Jose, and to a tragic level, Patrick feel somehow by virtue of their celebrity that their "magic" will rub off on people they control. What they are too lost to see is the word "development" in PD.  As you know so well, building healthy individuals means walking thru [sic.] the trenches with them and helping them analyze the moral, mental, and emotional choices they (and the parents) have to make and develop a  healthy strong person in the process. Hard to do when you are dictating from a broadcast booth and a board room."

Career finals

Singles 23 (12 titles, 11 runner-ups)

Grand Slam singles performance timeline

References

External links
 
 
 
 Mayotte Named USTA Coach

American male tennis players
Olympic silver medalists for the United States in tennis
Sportspeople from Springfield, Massachusetts
Stanford Cardinal men's tennis players
Tennis people from Massachusetts
Tennis players at the 1988 Summer Olympics
1960 births
Living people
Medalists at the 1988 Summer Olympics